Trenderas is a Philippine weekly musical drama series to be broadcast on TV5. It stars Isabella de Leon, Katrina Velarde and Lara Maigue. It premiered on September 13, 2014 and ended on December 27, 2014, it aired every Saturday at 9:30 PM.

Cast

Main cast
Isabella de Leon as Isabelle Raymundo
Katrina Velarde as Diva Salambangon
Lara Maigue as Lara San Miguel

Supporting cast
Marc Pingris as Robert Raymundo
Anjo Yllana as Dave Salambangon
JC de Vera as Conrad San Miguel
Tina Paner as Veronica
Dingdong Avanzado as Julio
Ara Mina as Diane San Miguel
Carl Guevarra as EJ
Leo Martinez as Ricardo Ventura
Francine Prieto as Viveka
Arnell Ignacio as Mother Pearl
Kitkat as Lady
K Brosas as Miley
Cacai Bautista as Katy
Edward Mendez as Benjo

Guest cast
Ogie Alcasid
Cooky Chua
Raimund Marasigan

See also
List of programs aired by TV5

References

External links
 

Philippine drama television series
2014 Philippine television series debuts
2014 Philippine television series endings
TV5 (Philippine TV network) original programming
Philippine musical television series
Filipino-language television shows